The 1959–60 Georgetown Hoyas men's basketball team represented Georgetown University during the 1959–60 NCAA University Division college basketball season. Tom Nolan coached them in his fourth and final season as head coach. The team was an independent and played its home games at McDonough Gymnasium on the Georgetown campus in Washington, D.C. The team finished with a record of 11-12 and had no post-season play.

Season recap
Diminutive junior guard Brian "Puddy" Sheehan, the teams point guard and a dominant player throughout his college career, had emerged the previous season as Georgetowns top scorer on an undersized team. He continued as such this season among taller teammates, averaging 21.3 points per game in his first six games, including a 29-point performance against Saint Peter's and 27 against Niagara. In the ninth game of the year, he scored 23 points against Providence in the championship game of the Providence Invitational Tournament. Despite usually playing against opponents who were six inches (15 cm) taller, he was Georgetowns top scorer for the second straight year, averaging 15.6 points per game for the season.

Either Sheehan or junior center Tom Coleman led the team in scoring in 15 games. In addition to providing a strong defensive presence, Coleman scored in double figures ten times, with 24 against Fordham and a season-high 26 versus Boston College.

Sophomore guard Jim Carrino joined the varsity team this year after a season on the freshman team. As reserve during the year, he nonetheless provided welcome assistance to Sheehan in the backcourt, coming off the bench to average 12.2 points per game and score in 12 games, including 18 points against Brown, 24 against Fordham, and 26 against Boston College. An injury cut his season short and he appeared in only 15 games, but his performance earned him a starting spot on the next year's team.

Sophomore forward Paul "Tag" Tagliabue also joined the varsity team this season after a year on the freshman team. He scored in double figures in eight of his last ten games and demonstrated a willingness to fight for rebounds under the basket; he led the Hoyas in rebounding for the season, and, as a three-year starter, was destined to become one of the top rebounders in school history.

Another sophomore, center Bob Sharpenter, had been a high school standout and a top scorer on the freshman team the previous season, but he struggled with the transition to the varsity this year. Playing in only 12 games, he averaged only 4.5 points per game and shot only 34% from the field, and also showed defensive weaknesses. He would correct his shooting and defense the following season, and by his senior year would emerge as one of Georgetowns great players.

Junior forward Tom Matan had been a standout the previous season, but with taller players like Tagliabue and Sharpenter now on the team, he moved to a swing role in which he was not as productive. Nonetheless, he scored in double figures six times and had a season-high 21 points against Fairfield.

The 1959-60 team finished with a record of 11-12 and had no post-season play. The last Georgetown men's basketball team with a losing record until the 1967-68 season, it was not ranked in the Top 20 in the Associated Press Poll or Coaches' Poll at any time.

Nolan left the head coaching position after the end of the season to focus on coaching the Georgetown baseball team, which he did through the 1978 season. He departed with a 40-49 record during his four-season tenure, with no winning seasons and no post-season tournament appearances. Georgetown hired assistant coach and former Georgetown and National Basketball Association (NBA) player Tommy O'Keefe as his replacement.

Roster
Sources

From the 1958-59 season through the 1967-68 season, Georgetown players wore even-numbered jerseys for home games and odd-numbered ones for away games; for example, a player would wear No. 10 at home and No. 11 on the road. Players are listed below by the even numbers they wore at home.

Senior guard and team captain Ed Hargaden Jr., was the first second-generation Georgetown mens basketball player, his father, guard Ed Hargaden, having been a standout guard on the 1932-33, 1933-34, and 1934-35 teams. He also was the only second-generation player in school history until center Patrick Ewings son, forward Patrick Ewing Jr., joined the team in the 2006-07 season.

Sophomore forward Paul Tagliabue later became Commissioner of the National Football League.

1959–60 schedule and results

Sources

|-
!colspan=9 style="background:#002147; color:#8D817B;"| Regular Season

References

Georgetown Hoyas men's basketball seasons
Georgetown
Georgetown Hoyas men's basketball team
Georgetown Hoyas men's basketball team